Francesca Lubiani (born 12 July 1977) is a former professional tennis player from Italy.

Her career-high singles ranking is world No. 58, which she reached on 26 May 1997. On 15 August 2005, she peaked at No. 114 in the doubles rankings.

WTA career finals

Doubles: 1 (runner-up)

ITF Circuit finals

Singles: 6 (4–2)

Doubles: 30 (15–15)

External links
 
 

1977 births
Living people
Italian female tennis players
Sportspeople from Bologna